Sud-Est (French for southeast) may refer to:

Places 
 Sud-Est (department), Haiti
 Sud-Est (development region), Romania
 Sud Department (Ivory Coast), defunct administrative subdivision of Ivory Coast
 Île Sud-Est, the largest island in the Egmont Islands (Six Iles)

Companies and transportation 
 Ferrovie del Sud Est, a railway company
 LGV Sud-Est, a French high-speed train line
 SNCASE (Société Nationale des Constructions Aéronautiques du Sud-Est), a former French aircraft manufacturer
 SNCF TGV Sud-Est, a TGV train

Other 
 Sud-Est (magazine)
 3rei Sud Est, a Romanian band

See also 

 Southeast (disambiguation)